Didier Sandre (born 17 August 1946) is a French actor. He appeared in more than sixty films since 1973.

Selected filmography

References

External links 

1946 births
Living people
20th-century French male actors
21st-century French male actors
French male film actors
Male actors from Paris